General Toshevo Municipality is a municipality (obshtina) in Dobrich Province, Northeastern Bulgaria, located in Southern Dobruja geographical region, bounded by Romania to the north. It is named after its administrative centre - the town of General Toshevo.

The main road E675 crosses the municipality centrally, connecting the province centre of Dobrich with the Romanian port of Constanța.

Settlements 

General Toshevo Municipality includes the following 42 places (towns are shown in bold):

Demography 
The following table shows the change of the population during the last four decades.

Religion 
According to the latest Bulgarian census of 2011, the religious composition, among those who answered the optional question on religious identification, was the following:

See also
Provinces of Bulgaria
Municipalities of Bulgaria
List of cities and towns in Bulgaria

References

External links
 Official website  

Municipalities in Dobrich Province